is a Japanese poet and prolific translator who writes frequently for The Japan Times. He has been called (by Gary Snyder) "perhaps the finest translator of contemporary Japanese poetry into American English".

Life

The son of a police officer, he was born in Taiwan in 1942. The family fled back to Japan at the end of WWII and encountered a number of hardships, including living in a stable. He was educated at Doshisha University in Kyoto, and moved to the United States in 1968. His first job was at the New York branch of the Japan External Trade Organization (JETRO), from April 1969; meanwhile he was translating art books and catalogs anonymously for Weatherhill. The first work to appear under his own name was a small collection of poems by Princess Shikishi. He attracted attention in the Japanese press with the anthology Ten Japanese Poets (1973) and his translations were soon published by the Chicago Review.

Most of Sato's translations are from Japanese into English, but he has also translated verse by John Ashbery into Japanese. He has also provided translations of primary sources on the subject of the samurai tradition in feudal Japan. In 2008, he translated Inose Naoki's biography of Yukio Mishima.

Sato was president of the Haiku Society of America from 1979 to 1981, and honorary curator of the American Haiku Archives in 2006-7. He was a professor of Japanese literature at St. Andrews Presbyterian College in North Carolina from 1985 to 1991, and then director of research and planning at JETRO New York. Since 1998 he has been an adjunct at the University of Massachusetts Amherst. He lives in New York City.

In 1982, Sato received the PEN Translation Prize.

Selected works
 Shikishi. Poems of Princess Shikishi. Translated by Hiroaki Sato. Bluefish, 1973
 Sato, Hiroaki. Ten Japanese Poets. Hanover, New Hampshire: Granite, 1973. . 
 Minoru, Yoshika. Lilac Garden. Translated by Hiroaki Sato. Chicago Review, 1975
 Takahashi, Mutsuo. Poems of a Penisist. Translated by Hiroaki Sato. Chicago Review, 1975
 Miyazawa, Kenji. Spring and Asura. Translated by Hiroaki Sato. Chicago Review, 1975
 Takahashi, Mutsuo. Winter Haiku: 25 Haiku by Mutsuo Takahashi. Translated by Hiroaki Sato. Manchester, NH: First Haiku Press, 1980
 Takamura, Kōtarō. Chieko and Other Poems of Takamura Kōtarō. Translated by Hiroaki Sato. University of Hawaii, 1980
 From the Country of Eight Islands: An Anthology of Japanese Poetry. Edited and translated by Hiroaki Sato and Burton Watson. Seattle, WA: University of Washington Press, 1981. , . . Winner of the American PEN translation prize in 1983
 Sato, Hiroaki. One Hundred Frogs: From Renga to Haiku to English. New York, NY: Weatherhill, 1983.. 
 Yagyu, Munenori. Sword and the Mind. Translated by Hiroaki Sato. Woodstock, N.Y.: Overlook Press, 1986
 Sato, Hiroaki. Haiku in English: A Poetic Form Expands. Tokyo, Japan: Simul Press, 1987. . 
 Sato, Hiroaki. That First Time: Six Renga on Love, and Other Poems. Laurinburg, NC: St. Andrews Press, 1988. 
 Miyazawa, Kenji. Future of Ice: Poems and Stories of a Japanese Buddhist. Translated by Hiroaki Sato. Farrar, Straus and Giroux, 1989
 Ashbery, John. 波ひとつ (Nami hitotsu). Translation into Japanese by Hiroaki Sato, of A Wave. 書肆山田, 1991
 Takahashi, Mutsuo. Sleeping Sinning Falling. Translated by Hiroaki Sato. City Lights Books, 1992
 Takamura, Kotaro. A Brief History of Imbecility: Poetry and Prose of Takamura Kotaro. Translated by Hiroaki Sato. University of Hawaii, 1992
 Ozaki, Hosai. Right under the big sky, I don't wear a hat: the haiku and prose of Hosai Ozaki. Translated by Hiroaki Sato. Berkeley, CA: Stone Bridge Press, 1993
 Shikishi. String of Beads: Complete Poems of Princess Shikishi. Translated by Hiroaki Sato. University of Hawaii Press, 1993
 Sato, Hiroaki. One Hundred Frogs. New York, NY: Weatherhill, 1995. . . (Collects one hundred different translations of the same poem)
 Sato, Hiroaki. Legends of the Samurai. Woodstock, N.Y.: Overlook Press, 1995. . 
 Matsuo, Basho. Basho's Narrow road: spring & autumn passages. Translated from the Japanese, with annotations by Hiroaki Sato. Berkeley, CA: Stone Bridge Press, 1996
 Saikō, Ema. Breeze through Bamboo: Selected Kanshi of Ema Saiko. Translated from the Japanese by Hiroaki Sato. Columbia University Press, 1997. (Winner of the 1999 Japan‐United States Friendship Commission Japanese Literary Translation Prize)
 Mishima, Yukio. Silk and Insight. Translated from the Japanese by Hiroaki Sato. Armonk, N.Y.: M. E. Sharpe, 1998
 Hagiwara, Sakutaro. Howling at the Moon and Blue. Translated from the Japanese by Hiroaki Sato. Green Integer, 2001
 Taneda, Santoka. Grass and Tree Cairn. Translated by Hiroaki Sato. Winchester, VA: Red Moon Press, 2002
 Mishima, Yukio. My Friend Hitler: and Other Plays. Translated by Hiroaki Sato. Columbia University Press, 2002
 Yagyu, Munenori. The Sword and the Mind: The Classic Japanese Treatise on Swordsmanship and Tactics. Translated from the Japanese by Hiroaki Sato. Fall River Press, 2004.
 Sato, Hiroaki. Erotic Haiku. Yohan Shuppan, 2005
 Miyazawa, Kenji. Miyazawa Kenji: Selections. Translated from the Japanese by Hiroaki Sato. University of California, 2007
 Sato, Hiroaki. Japanese Women Poets: An Anthology. Armonk, N.Y.: M.E. Sharpe, 2007. , . 
 Inose, Naoki with Hiroaki Sato. Persona: A Biography of Yukio Mishima. Stone Bridge Press, 2012
 Sato, Hiroaki. Snow in a Silver Bowl: A Quest for the World of Yugen. Red Moon Press, 2013.
 Sakutarō Hagiwara. Cat Town. Translated by Hiroaki Sato. New York Review Books, 2014.
 Sato, Hiroaki. On Haiku. New Directions Publishing, 2018.

See also
 Michi Kobi

References

External links
List of columns by Sato at The Japan Times

Japanese translators
English-language writers from Japan
English-language haiku poets
1942 births
Living people
Doshisha University alumni
Japanese literature academics
20th-century Japanese poets